The 15th Asia Pacific Screen Awards was held on 11 November 2022 at the Home of the Arts, Gold Coast, Queensland, Australia.

Jury
The juries are composed of:

International jury
Guneet Monga, Indian film producer
Mohamed Hefzy, Egyptian screenwriter and producer
Numan Acar, German-Turkish actor and producer
Sophie Hyde, Australian film director
Vimukthi Jayasundara, Sri Lankan filmmaker and critic

International nominations council
Hong-joon Kim, director of Korean Film Archive and a professor emeritus at Korea National University of Arts
Anne Démy-Geroe, Australian film curator and lecturer
Anderson Le, artistic director of Hawaii International Film Festival
Beena Paul, Indian film editor
Delphine Garde-Mroueh, film curator and researcher
Gulnara Abikeyeva, Kazakh film critic and researcher
Kiki Fung, programmer of Hong Kong International Film Festival

Youth, Animation, Documentary international jury
Baby Ruth Villarama, Filipino documentarian and writer
Shin Su-won, South Korean director and screenwriter
Zhao Qi, Chinese documentary filmmaker
Tearepa Kahi, New Zealand director

Youth, Animation, Documentary nominations council
Meenakshi Shedde, Indian film curator
Carl Joseph Papa, Filipino animation filmmaker
Faramarz K-Rahber, Iranian-Australian filmmaker

Winners and nominees
The nominations were announced on 12 October 2022.
  and with

References

External links

Asia Pacific Screen Awards
2022 in Australian cinema
Asia